The Eurovision Song Contest 1967 was the 12th edition of the annual Eurovision Song Contest. Organised by the European Broadcasting Union (EBU) and host broadcaster Österreichischer Rundfunk (ORF), the contest was held at the Großer Festsaal der Wiener Hofburg on 8 April 1967, becoming the first contest held in the month of April, and was hosted by Austrian actress Erica Vaal.

The  won the contest for the first time with the song "Puppet on a String", written and composed by Bill Martin and Phil Coulter, and performed by Sandie Shaw.  The entry had one of the widest margins of victory ever witnessed in the competition; it garnered more than twice as many points as the second-placed song. Shaw intensely disliked the composition, though her attitude towards the song somewhat mellowed in later years, even releasing a new version in 2007.

This was the last contest to be transmitted only in black and white as it would begin to be transmitted in colour from the  edition onwards.

Location 

The 1967 Eurovision Song Contest was held in Vienna, the capital of Austria. The venue for the contest was the Festival Hall of the Hofburg Palace, which was the principal winter residence of the Habsburg dynasty, rulers of the Austro-Hungarian empire. It currently serves as the official residence of the President of Austria.

Format 
The stage setup was a little unusual this year. There was a staircase in the middle of the stage as well as two revolving mirrored walls on both ends of the stage; they began revolving at the start of each song, and stopped at its end. A change in rule also required half of every nation's jury to be less than 30 years old.

The presenter Erica Vaal became confused whilst the voting was taking place, and declared the United Kingdom's entry to be the winner before the last country, had announced its votes. She also ended the programme by congratulating the winning song and country, and saying "goodbye" in several different languages.

Participating countries 

Denmark chose not to participate this year and left the contest at this point, not to be returning again until 1978. The reason was that the new director for the TV entertainment department at DR thought that the money could be spent in a better way.

The entry from Luxembourg, "L'amour est bleu", sung by Vicky Leandros, came in fourth; nonetheless, it went on to become one of the biggest hits of the 1967 contest, and a year later would be a big instrumental hit for French musician, Paul Mauriat, under the English title, "Love is Blue". 
Television presenter, artist and musician Rolf Harris provided the commentary for BBC Television viewers. Switzerland received zero votes for the second time. Portugal was represented by Eduardo Nascimento, who was the first black male singer in the history of the contest, performing "O vento mudou" ("The wind changed"). Rumours claimed that Portuguese prime minister Salazar had chosen this particular singer to show the rest of Europe that he was not racist.

Conductors 
Each performance had a conductor who was maestro of the orchestra. This was the first contest to have a unique conductor for every entry, as prior contests usually had the host conductor conduct multiple entries in addition to their own country's entry.

 Dolf van der Linden
 Claude Denjean
 Johannes Fehring
 Franck Pourcel
 
 
 Mats Olsson
 Ossi Runne
 Hans Blum
 Francis Bay
 Kenny Woodman
 Manuel Alejandro
 Øivind Bergh
 Aimé Barelli
 
 Giancarlo Chiaramello
 Noel Kelehan

Returning artists

Participants and results

Detailed voting results 

The voting sequence was one of the more chaotic in Eurovision history; the students from Vienna University who were operating the scoreboard made several errors during the telecast, which were corrected by the scrutineer. Hostess Erica Vaal also began to announce the winner before realising she had excluded the Irish jury.

Spokespersons 

Listed below is the order in which votes were cast during the 1967 contest along with the spokesperson who was responsible for announcing the votes for their respective country.

 Corry Brokken
 TBC
 
 André Claveau
 Maria Manuela Furtado
 
 
 
 Anaid Iplicjian
 Eugène Senelle
 Michael Aspel
 Margarita Nicola
 
 TBC
 Saša Novak
 Mike Bongiorno
 Gay Byrne

Broadcasts 

Each participating broadcaster was required to relay the contest via its networks. Non-participating EBU member broadcasters were also able to relay the contest as "passive participants". Broadcasters were able to send commentators to provide coverage of the contest in their own native language and to relay information about the artists and songs to their television viewers.

Known details on the broadcasts in each country, including the specific broadcasting stations and commentators are shown in the tables below. In addition to the participating countries, the contest was also reportedly broadcast in Czechoslovakia, East Germany, Poland and the Soviet Union via Intervision.

Notes

References

External links 

 
1967
Music festivals in Austria
1960s in Vienna
1967 in Austria
1967 in music
April 1967 events in Europe
Events in Vienna